Angela Olive Pearce (formerly Carter,  Stalker; 7 May 1940 – 16 February 1992), who published under the name Angela Carter, was an English novelist, short story writer, poet, and journalist, known for her feminist, magical realism, and picaresque works. She is best known for her book The Bloody Chamber, which was published in 1979. In 2008, The Times ranked Carter tenth in their list of "The 50 greatest British writers since 1945". In 2012, Nights at the Circus was selected as the best ever winner of the James Tait Black Memorial Prize.

Biography

Born Angela Olive Stalker in Eastbourne, in 1940, to Sophia Olive (née Farthing; 1905–1969), a cashier at Selfridge's, and journalist Hugh Alexander Stalker (1896–1988), Carter was evacuated as a child to live in Yorkshire with her maternal grandmother. After attending Streatham and Clapham High School, in south London, she began work as a journalist on The Croydon Advertiser, following in her father's footsteps. Carter attended the University of Bristol where she studied English literature.

She married twice, first in 1960 to Paul Carter, divorcing in 1972. In 1969, she used the proceeds of her Somerset Maugham Award to leave her husband and relocate for two years to Tokyo, where she claims in Nothing Sacred (1982) that she "learnt what it is to be a woman and became radicalised". She wrote about her experiences there in articles for New Society and a collection of short stories, Fireworks: Nine Profane Pieces (1974), and evidence of her experiences in Japan can also be seen in The Infernal Desire Machines of Doctor Hoffman (1972).

She then explored the United States, Asia and Europe, helped by her fluency in French and German. She spent much of the late 1970s and 1980s as a writer in residence at universities, including the University of Sheffield, Brown University, the University of Adelaide, and the University of East Anglia. In 1977, Carter met Mark Pearce, with whom she had one son and whom she married shortly before her death. In 1979, both The Bloody Chamber, and her feminist essay, The Sadeian Woman and the Ideology of Pornography, appeared. In the essay, according to the writer Marina Warner, Carter "deconstructs the arguments that underlie The Bloody Chamber. It's about desire and its destruction, the self-immolation of women, how women collude and connive with their condition of enslavement. She was much more independent-minded than the traditional feminist of her time."

As well as being a prolific writer of fiction, Carter contributed many articles to The Guardian, The Independent and New Statesman, collected in Shaking a Leg. She adapted a number of her short stories for radio and wrote two original radio dramas on Richard Dadd and Ronald Firbank. Two of her fictions have been adapted for film: The Company of Wolves (1984) and The Magic Toyshop (1967). She was actively involved in both adaptations; her screenplays are published in the collected dramatic writings, The Curious Room, together with her radio scripts, a libretto for an opera of Virginia Woolf's Orlando: A Biography, an unproduced screenplay entitled The Christchurch Murders (based on the Parker–Hulme murder case, which also inspired Peter Jackson's Heavenly Creatures), and other works. These neglected works, as well as her controversial television documentary, The Holy Family Album, are discussed in Charlotte Crofts' book Anagrams of Desire (2003). Her novel Nights at the Circus won the 1984 James Tait Black Memorial Prize for literature. Her last novel, Wise Children, is a surreal wild ride through British theatre and music hall traditions.

Carter died aged 51 in 1992 at her home in London after developing lung cancer. At the time of her death, she had started work on a sequel to Charlotte Brontë's Jane Eyre based on the later life of Jane's stepdaughter, Adèle Varens; only a synopsis survives.

Works

Novels
Shadow Dance (1966, also known as Honeybuzzard)
The Magic Toyshop (1967)
Several Perceptions (1968)
Heroes and Villains (1969)
Love (1971)
The Infernal Desire Machines of Doctor Hoffman (1972, also known as The War of Dreams)
The Passion of New Eve (1977)
Nights at the Circus (1984)
Wise Children (1991)

Short fiction collections
Fireworks: Nine Profane Pieces (1974; also published as Fireworks: Nine Stories in Various Disguises and Fireworks)
The Bloody Chamber (1979)
The Bridegroom (1983) (Uncollected short story)
Black Venus (1985; published as Saints and Strangers in the United States)
American Ghosts and Old World Wonders (1993)
Burning Your Boats (1995)

Poetry collections
Five Quiet Shouters (1966)
Unicorn (1966)
Unicorn: The Poetry of Angela Carter (2015)

Dramatic works
Come Unto These Yellow Sands: Four Radio Plays (1985)
The Curious Room: Plays, Film Scripts and an Opera (1996) (includes Carter's screenplays for adaptations of    The Company of Wolves and The Magic Toyshop; also includes the contents of Come Unto These Golden Sands: Four Radio Plays)

Children's books
The Donkey Prince (1970, illustrated by Eros Keith)
Miss Z, the Dark Young Lady (1970, illustrated by Eros Keith)
Comic and Curious Cats (1979, illustrated by Martin Leman)
Moonshadow (1982) illustrated by Justin Todd
Sea-Cat and Dragon King (2000, illustrated by Eva Tatcheva)

Non-fiction
The Sadeian Woman and the Ideology of Pornography (1979)
Nothing Sacred: Selected Writings (1982)
Expletives Deleted: Selected Writings (1992)
Shaking a Leg: Collected Journalism and Writing (1997)

She wrote two entries in "A Hundred Things Japanese" published in 1975 by the Japan Culture Institute.   It says "She has lived in Japan both from 1969 to 1971 and also during 1974" (p. 202).

As editor
Wayward Girls and Wicked Women: An Anthology of Subversive Stories (1986)
The Virago Book of Fairy Tales (1990) a.k.a. The Old Wives' Fairy Tale Book
The Second Virago Book of Fairy Tales (1992) a.k.a. Strange Things Still Sometimes Happen: Fairy Tales From Around the World (1993)
Angela Carter's Book of Fairy Tales (2005) (collects the two Virago Books above)

As translator
The Fairy Tales of Charles Perrault (1977)
Sleeping Beauty and Other Favourite Fairy Tales (1982) illustrated by Michael Foreman (Perrault stories with two by Leprince de Beaumont)

Film adaptations
The Company of Wolves (1984) adapted by Carter with Neil Jordan from her short story of the same name, "Wolf-Alice" and "The Werewolf"
The Magic Toyshop (1987) adapted by Carter from her novel of the same name, and directed by David Wheatley

Radio plays
Vampirella (1976) written by Carter and directed by Glyn Dearman for BBC. Formed the basis for the short story "The Lady of the House of Love".
Come Unto These Yellow Sands (1979)
The Company of Wolves (1980) adapted by Carter from her short story of the same name, and directed by Glyn Dearman for BBC
Puss-in-Boots (1982) adapted by Carter from her short story and directed by Glyn Dearman for BBC
A Self-Made Man (1984)

Television
The Holy Family Album (1991)
Omnibus: Angela Carter's Curious Room (1992)

Works on Angela Carter
Crofts, Charlotte, "Curiously downbeat hybrid" or "radical retelling"? – Neil Jordan’s and Angela Carter’s The Company of Wolves. In Cartmell, Deborah, I. Q. Hunter, Heidi Kaye and Imelda Whelehan (eds), Sisterhoods Across the Literature Media Divide,  London: Pluto Press, 1998, pp. 48–63.]
Crofts, Charlotte, Anagrams of Desire: Angela Carter's Writing for Radio, Film and Television. Manchester: Manchester University Press, 2003.
Crofts, Charlotte, ‘The Other of the Other’: Angela Carter's ‘New-Fangled’ Orientalism. In Munford, Rebecca Re-Visiting Angela Carter Texts, Contexts, Intertexts. London & New York: Palgrave Macmillan, 2006, pp. 87–109.
Dimovitz, Scott A., Angela Carter: Surrealist, Psychologist, Moral Pornographer. New York: Routledge, 2016.
Dimovitz, Scott A. "I Was the Subject of the Sentence Written on the Mirror: Angela Carter's Short Fiction and the Unwriting of the Psychoanalytic Subject". Lit: Literature Interpretation Theory 21.1 (2010): 1–19.
Dimovitz, Scott A., "Angela Carter’s Narrative Chiasmus: The Infernal Desire Machines of Doctor Hoffman and The Passion of New Eve". Genre XVII (2009): 83–111.
Dimovitz, Scott A., "Cartesian Nuts: Rewriting the Platonic Androgyne in Angela Carter's Japanese Surrealism". FEMSPEC: An Interdisciplinary Feminist Journal, 6:2 (December 2005): 15–31.
Dmytriieva, Valeriia V., "Gender Alterations in English and French Modernist 'Bluebeard' Fairytale". English Language and literature studies, 6:3. (2016): 16–20.

Gordon, Edmund, The Invention of Angela Carter: A Biography. London: Chatto & Windus, 2016.
Kérchy, Anna, Body-Texts in the Novels of Angela Carter. Writing from a Corporeagraphic Perspective. Lewiston, New York: Edwin Mellen Press, 2008.
Milne, Andrew, The Bloody Chamber d'Angela Carter, Paris: Editions Le Manuscrit, Université, 2006.
Milne, Andrew, Angela Carter's The Bloody Chamber: A Reader's Guide, Paris: Editions Le Manuscrit Université, 2007.
Munford, Rebecca (ed.), Re-Visiting Angela Carter Texts, Contexts, Intertexts . London & New York: Palgrave Macmillan, 2006.
Tonkin, Maggie, Angela Carter and Decadence: Critical Fictions/Fictional Critiques. Basingstoke: Palgrave Macmillan, 2012.
Topping, Angela, Focus on The Bloody Chamber and Other Stories. London: The Greenwich Exchange, 2009.

Commemoration 

English Heritage unveiled a blue plaque at Carter's final home at 107, The Chase in Clapham, South London in September 2019. She wrote many of her books in the sixteen years she lived at the address, as well as tutoring the young Kazuo Ishiguro.
In 2008, the British Library acquired the Angela Carter Papers, a large collection of 224 files and volumes containing manuscripts, correspondence, personal diaries, photographs and audio cassettes.

References

Further reading

Wisker, Gina. "At Home all was Blood and Feathers: The Werewolf in the Kitchen - Angela Carter and Horror". In Clive Bloom (ed), Creepers: British Horror and Fantasy in the Twentieth Century. London and Boulder CO: Pluto Press, 1993, pp. 161–75.

External links

Angela Carter's radio work
Angela Carter at the British Library

BBC interview (video, 25 June 1991, 25 mins)

Angela Carter remembered, Daily Telegraph, 3 May 2010

Angela Carter in conversation with Elizabeth Jolley, British Library (audio, 1988, 53 mins)
Angela Carter essay on Colette, London Review of Books, Vol. 2 No. 19 · 2 October 1980
"A Conversation with Angela Carter" by Anna Katsavos, The Review of Contemporary Fiction, Fall 1994, Vol. 14.3

1940 births
1992 deaths
20th-century British short story writers
20th-century English novelists
20th-century English women writers
20th-century translators
Academics of the University of East Anglia
Academics of the University of Sheffield
Alumni of the University of Bristol
British women short story writers
Deaths from lung cancer in England
English feminist writers
English short story writers
English socialist feminists
English socialists
English women novelists
James Tait Black Memorial Prize recipients
John Llewellyn Rhys Prize winners
Magic realism writers
People from Eastbourne
Weird fiction writers
Women science fiction and fantasy writers